Garrick may refer to:

 Garrick (name), for the name's origin and people with either the surname or given name, the most famous being:
 David Garrick (1717–1779), English actor
 Garrick Club, a London gentlemen's club named in honour of David Garrick
 Garrick Theatre (disambiguation), various theatres named after David Garrick
 Garrick Collection, early printed editions of English drama bequeathed by David Garrick to the British Museum
 Garrick F.C., defunct Sheffield based football club
 Garrick or Lichia amia, a fish species
 Flash (Jay Garrick), a DC Comics superhero and the first to use the name Flash
 Garrick, Saskatchewan, Canada, a hamlet
 Garrick's Ait, an ait or island in the River Thames in England
 Garrick Bar, one of the oldest public houses in Belfast, Northern Ireland
 Garrick, a play by the Catalan mime comedy group Tricicle

See also
 Carrick (disambiguation)
 Garak (disambiguation)
 Garrick/Milne Prize, a biennial art prize that was discontinued after 2005